Bar One or Bar•One is a popular chocolate bar invented and manufactured in South Africa by Nestlé and sold in South Africa and India.  It is similar to the English Mars Bars and consists of a layer of malted nougat with a caramel topping and covered in milk chocolate. In South Africa, there are other variations, including a Bar One Peanut version and one flavoured with coffee.

Overview 
It was first manufactured in South Africa in 1965, and is produced at the Nestlé factory in East London. In India, it is one of the top 5 most sold chocolate bars.

Spinoffs 
Other products have also been released using the Bar One branding or popular cuisine made using the chocolate bar.

 Bar One ice cream - a popular South African flavour of ice cream.
 Bar One chocolate cake - a cake made using the chocolate bars.
 Bar One chocolate sauce - a popular sauce either made at home using the chocolate or bought under a brand name source manufactured by Nestle.
 Bar One cereal- manufactured by Nestlé for the South African market.

Advertising slogans 
 South Africa: "For a 25-hour day"

References

External links
 

Brand name confectionery
Chocolate bars
1965 establishments in South Africa
Products introduced in 1965
South African confectionery
South African snack foods